The Diocese of Monteverde (Latin: Dioecesis Montis Viridis) was a Roman Catholic diocese located in the town of Monteverde in the province of Avellino in Southern Italy. In 1718, it was suppressed to the Diocese of Sant'Angelo dei Lombardi e Bisaccia.

Ordinaries
Gerolamo de Caro (13 Mar 1521 – 3 Jul 1531 Appointed, Titular Bishop of Cannae)

References

Former Roman Catholic dioceses in Italy